The Acura ILX is a compact car (C-segment) manufactured and marketed by Honda under the Acura brand, based on the ninth-generation Civic sedan. The ILX replaced the Canadian market exclusive Acura CSX.  The gasoline-electric hybrid version was Acura's first.

Overview
The concept version was unveiled at the 2012 North American International Auto Show, the production version was presented in the 2012 Chicago Auto Show. The ILX introduces a new design that Acura calls "aero-fused dynamics". Mass production commenced on April 23 at Honda's assembly facility in Greensburg, Indiana and U.S. sales began on May 22.

The ILX's body in white uses 59% high strength steel ranging from 440-980 MPa yield strength grades, aluminum is used for the hood and front bumper beam. Compared to the Civic, the ILX uses Acura's "Amplitude Reactive" dampers and a larger more rigid steering shaft for improved handling and ride quality characteristics.

Options are grouped into Premium and Technology packages and include leather upholstery, 17" alloy wheels, navigation system, premium audio system with SiriusXM satellite radio, and high intensity discharge headlamps. Both option packages include a multi-view rear backup camera with regular, wide-angle, and top-down modes.

For the 2014 model year the ILX came standard with 17-inch wheels, leather interior, heated front seats, an eight-way power driver's seat, tri-angle backup camera and audio subwoofer with Active Noise Cancellation.

For the 2015 model year, the ILX Hybrid was discontinued due to slow sales. Through May of 2014, only 2,660 Hybrid units were sold since its introduction.

2016 facelift
The refreshed 2016 ILX was unveiled during November 2014 at the Los Angeles Auto Show, and went on sale in February 2015. It now came exclusively with an "Earth Dreams" direct injected 2.4-liter four-cylinder DOHC i-VTEC engine mated to an 8-speed dual-clutch transmission, a very closely related powertrain to that of the TLX, first introduced in 2014 (as a 2015 model). The manual transmission ILX was also discontinued with the release of the facelift. Only around 4% of ILX sold had manual transmissions from the 2013-2015 model years. "Jewel Eye" LED headlamps (low and high beams, DRL pipe and amber turn signals) similar to those on other Acura models (RLX, MDX and TLX) are standard, along with new LED tail lamps. A new "A-Spec" trim was offered, which included sporty exterior and interior styling enhancements.  Production of the 2016 ILX began during January 2015 moving to the Marysville Auto Plant in Marysville, Ohio.

2019 facelift
In September 2018, Acura revealed a second facelift for the ILX, incorporating what the company markets as its "Diamond Pentagon" grille. The headlights are revised along with front bumper. In the rear of the ILX, the taillights are revised, and the license plate has been dropped from the trunk to the rear bumper. In the interior, the overall design has revised seats, with the availability of red leather (only on the A-Spec), and an updated infotainment system — the latter 30% faster. AcuraWatch is now standard on all ILX's. The powertrain has remained the same for 2019. The ILX A-Spec now makes the exterior look more aggressive. It comes with 18" wheels, red or black leather seats with ultrasuede inserts, aluminum pedals, and other equipment.

Safety

Specifications
Honda has offered several different four-cylinder gasoline engines in this model, similar to those in the CSX, TSX, and Civic Si. The ILX is not sold in Japan.

2013–2015

2016–2022

The ILX originally featured a 2.0-liter I4 engine making 150 hp mated to a 5-speed automatic transmission, or a version of the Civic Si's 201 hp 2.4-liter I4 engine mated to a 6-speed manual. Starting from 2016, the ILX is offered only with the 2.4-liter I4 engine and the 8 speed DCT.

Discontinuation
The ILX was discontinued after the 2022 model year, with the eleventh-generation Honda Civic-based Integra liftback replaced it as the brand's entry-level offering.

Sales

References

External links

ILX
Cars introduced in 2012
2020s cars
Compact cars
Sedans
Front-wheel-drive vehicles
Motor vehicles manufactured in the United States